List of Battles in South Africa is a list of all military conflicts or battles fought within the borders of South Africa

Khoikhoi–Dutch Wars (1659 – 1677) 
 First Khoikhoi–Dutch War 1659 – 1660
 Second Khoikhoi–Dutch War 1673 – 1677

Anglo-Dutch rivalry (1664–1804) 

Bartolomeu Dias, a Portuguese navigator, discovered the Cape of Good Hope in 1488. The Dutch settlement in the area began in March 1647. A Dutch expedition of 90 Calvinist settlers, under the command of Jan van Riebeeck, founded the first permanent settlement near the Cape of Good Hope in 1652. Cape Colony established in 1652.
31 December 1687 a community of Huguenots arrived at the Cape from the Netherlands. See also Huguenots in South Africa.
 Occupation of Simon's Town by the British 14 June 1795
 Capture of Cape Town by the British 14–16 June 1795
 First Occupation of Cape Colony by the British 1795, relinquished control of the territory in 1803
 Second Occupation of Cape Colony by the British from 19 January 1806 until incorporated into the independent Union of South Africa in 1910

Cape of Good Hope War (Cape Colony) 
 Battle of Muizenberg 1795
 Battle of Blaauwberg, also known as the Battle of Cape Town 8 January 1806

Xhosa Wars
also known as the Kaffir Wars or Cape Frontier Wars or Dispossession Wars
First war (1779–81)
Second war (1789–93)
Third war (1799–1803)
Fourth War (1811–12)
Fifth War (1818–19)
Sixth War (1834–36)
Seventh War (1846–1847)
Eighth War (1850–53)
Cattle Killings (1856–58)
Ninth War (1877–79)

Ndwandwe–Zulu War (1817–19) 
Also known as the Zulu Civil War. The fallout from this war led to the catastrophe known as the Mfeqane.

 Battle of Gqokli Hill (1818)
 Battle of Mhlatuze River (1819)

Battles between the Voortrekkers and Ndebele (1836–1837)
Voortrekkers under Andries Potgieter defeat the Ndebele at the Battle of Vegkop 1836
Voortrekkers under Andries Potgieter, Piet Uys and Gerrit Maritz, helped by Rolong and Griqua tribes, defeat Ndebele at Mosega 17 January 1837

Battles between the Voortrekkers and the Zulu (1838–40) 
 Battle of Italeni 9 April 1838
 Battle of Blood River 16 December 1838
 Battle of Maqongqe January 1840

Anglo-Pedi Wars (1876–1879) 
 Wars of Resistance (1838)
 Sekhukhune Wars (1876–1879)

Natal (1842–1843)
 Battle of Congella 1842

Transorangia (1845–1848)
 Battle of Zwartkoppies 1845 between local Boer farmers and the Griqua people.
 Battle of Boomplaats 1848

South African Republic (1854-)

 The Boers defeat the Ndebele at Makapansgat 1854

Zulu Succession (1856)

 Battle of Ndondakusuka 2 December 1856

Free State–Basotho Wars (1858–1868)

 Senekal's War 1858
 Seqiti War which included two conflicts, in 1865−1866 and 1867−1868

Koranna War (1868)

The Koranna War breaks out along the Orange River. 1868

Anglo-Zulu War (11 January – 4 July 1879) 
 Battle of Isandlwana 22 January 1879
 Battle of Rorke's Drift 22–23 January 1879
 Battle of Intombe (also Intombi or Intombi River Drift) 12 March 1879
 Battle of Hlobane 28 March 1879
 Battle of Kambula 29 March 1879
 Battle of Gingindlovu (uMgungundlovu) 2 April 1879
 Siege of Eshowe 22 January – 3 April 1879
 Battle of Ulundi 4 July 1879

First Boer War (16 December 1880 – 23 March 1881) 
The British recognised the two Boer Republics in 1852 and 1854, but the annexation of the Transvaal in 1877 led to the First Boer War in 1880 and 1881. After British defeats, most heavily at the Battle of Majuba Hill, Transvaal independence was restored subject to certain conditions, but relations were uneasy.

 Action at Bronkhorstspruit 20 December 1880
 Battle of Laing's Nek 28 January 1881
 Battle of Rooihuiskraal 12 February 1881
 Battle of Schuinshoogte also known as Ingogo 8 February 1881
 Battle of Majuba Hill 27 February 1881

Between the two Boer Wars 
 Jameson Raid 29 December 1895 – 2 January 1896
 Second Matabele War also known as the Matabeleland Rebellion March 1896 – October 1897

Second Boer War (11 October 1899 – 31 May 1902) 
between the British Empire and the two independent Boer republics of the South African Republic (Transvaal Republic) and the Orange Free State.

1899
 Battle of Kraaipan (Afrikaans: Geveg by Kraaipan )12 October 1899
 Siege of Kimberley (Beleg van Kimberley) 14 October 1899 – 15 February 1900
 Battle of Talana Hill also known as Battle of Glencoe (Slag van Talana) 20 October 1899
 Battle of Elandslaagte (Slag van Elandslaagte) 21 October 1899
 Battle of Ladysmith / Battle of Nicholsonsnek (Slag by Nicholsonsnek) 30 October 1899
 Battle of Belmont (1899) (Slag van Belmont) 23 November 1899
 Battle of Willow Grange (Slag by Willowgrange) 23 November 1899
 Battle of Graspan (Slag by Graspan) 25 November 1899
 Battle of Modder River (Slag van (die) Tweeriviere) 28 November 1899
 Siege of Ladysmith (Beleg van Ladysmith, Slag by Platrand) between 30 October 1899 and 28 February 1900
 Relief of Ladysmith 
 Battle of Stormberg (Slag by Stormberg) 10 December 1899
 Battle of Magersfontein (Slag by/van Magersfontein) 11 December 1899
 Black Week 10–17 December 1899
 Battle of Colenso (Slag by/van Colenso) 15 December 1899

1900
 Battle of Sunnyside 1 January 1900
 Battle of Spion Kop (Slag van Spioenkop) 23–24 January 1900
 Battle of Vaal Krantz  (Slag by Vaalkrans) 5–7 February 1900
 Battle of the Tugela Heights(or Thukela) 14–27 February 1900
 Battle of Paardeberg (Slag van Paardeberg/Perdeberg) 18–27 February 1900
 Bloody Sunday (1900) 18 February 1900
 Siege of Mafeking over a period of 217 days, from October 1899 to May 1900
 Battle of Poplar Grove/ Battle of Abrahamskraal 7 March 1900
 Battle of Driefontein 10 March 1900 (A.C. Doyle)(Rickard, J (2 March 2007), Battle of Driefontein, 10 March 1900)
 Battle of Brandfort 25 March 1900
 Battle of Sanna's Post (aka Korn Spruit, Slag van Sannaspos) 31 March 1900
 Battle of Reddersburg 4 April 1900
 Siege of Wepener 10 April 1900
 Battle of Lindley 31 May 1900
 Battle of Roodewalstasie 7 June 1900
 Battle of Diamond Hill (Donkerhoek) 11–12 June 1900
 Battle of Silkaatsnek 11 July 1900
 Battle of Dwarsvlei 11 July 1900
 Battle of Onderstepoort 11 July 1900
 Battle of Elands River (1900) 4–16 August 1900
 Battle of Bergendal (also known as the Battle of Belfast) 27 August 1900
 Battle of Bothaville (Doornkraal) 6 November 1900
 Battle of Leliefontein (also known as the Battle of Witkloof) 7 November 1900
 Battle of Dewetsdorp 19 November 1900
 Battle of Renosterkop 19 November 1900
 Battle of Modder River 28 November 1900
 Battle of Nooitgedacht 13 December 1900
 Battle of Helvetia 29 December 1900

1901
 Battle of Vlakfontein 29 May 1901
 Battle of Groenkloof 5 September 1901
 Battle of Elands River (1901) or Modderfontein 17 September 1901
 Battle of Blood River Poort or Scheeper's Nek 17 September 1901
 Battle of Bakenlaagte 30 October 1901
 Battle of Groenkop (Battle of Tweefontein) 25 December 1901

1902
 Battle of Ysterspruit 25 February 1902
 Battle of Tweebosch or De Klipdrift 7 March 1902
 Battle of Bosbult 31 March 1902
 Battle of Rooiwal 11 April 1902

First World War (1914–1918)

 Maritz rebellion 15 September 1914 – 4 February 1915
 Battle of Kakamas 4 February 1915
 Invasion of Walvis Baai 1915, at the time it was a South African exclave.

See also 
 Military history of South Africa
 List of conflicts in Africa

References

 
History of South Africa
Battles
South Africa
Battles